Alfred Gilles (17 December 1908 – 5 December 1983) was a Belgian wrestler. He competed in the men's Greco-Roman bantamweight at the 1936 Summer Olympics.

References

External links
 

1908 births
1983 deaths
Belgian male sport wrestlers
Olympic wrestlers of Belgium
Wrestlers at the 1936 Summer Olympics
Place of birth missing
20th-century Belgian people